Jean-Marie Balestre (9 April 1921 – 27 March 2008) was a French auto racing administrator, who became President of the Fédération Internationale du Sport Automobile (FISA) from 1978 to 1991 and President of the Fédération Internationale de l'Automobile (FIA) from 1985 to 1993.

Early life
Balestre was born at Saint-Rémy-de-Provence, Bouches-du-Rhône. He studied law in Paris, and afterwards worked as a journalist on a number of publications.

World War II
Details of Balestre's activities during World War II are unknown. He was a member of the French Nazi division of the SS, but later claimed to have been an undercover agent for the French Resistance, and received the Legion of Honour for services to France in 1968.

Career
After the war, he worked as a journalist for Robert Hersant at a successful French automobile magazine called L'Auto-Journal. Balestre continued to work with Hersant as he expanded his publishing operations, which made Balestre a wealthy individual. He was a founding member of the Fédération Française du Sport Automobile, a French national motorsport organization, in 1950, and in 1961 became the first president of the International Karting Commission of the FIA. He was elected president of the FFSA in 1973 and president of the FIA's International Sporting Commission in 1978. He was instrumental in transforming the International Sporting Commission into the Fédération Internationale du Sport Automobile (FISA) in 1978.

In the late 1970s, photographs began to circulate of Balestre wearing a German SS uniform, and he took unsuccessful legal action to suppress their publication.

Balestre was heavily involved in what is colloquially called the FISA–FOCA war, a political battle over finances and control of the Formula One World Championships between 1980 and 1982. Balestre and his opponent, Bernie Ecclestone, settled the dispute after Enzo Ferrari brokered a compromise. Balestre signed the first Concorde Agreement, under which FOCA was granted the commercial rights to Formula One while the FIA retained control of all sporting and technical regulations.

In 1986, a few hours after the death of Henri Toivonen and Sergio Cresto in a crash, Balestre announced the unilateral decision of FISA to ban Group B rallying in favour of the slower, less technically advanced Group A. Despite this decision, WRC driver fatalities peaked in 1989.

Balestre is credited with establishing specific crash test requirements for Formula One cars, significantly improving the safety of the sport. He was also a key proponent of the switch to naturally aspirated engines in 1989, also arguing that such a move was essential for safety reasons.

However, Balestre has also been accused of using his power for more than it was intended. In , after Ayrton Senna and Alain Prost collided at Suzuka, there were implications in Autosport magazine that Balestre was involved in manipulating the World Championship in favor of Prost, as Senna would be disqualified from the race, fined, and suspended. This ultimately led to Max Mosley's decision to run for the FISA presidency. Senna fell out with Balestre who threatened to revoke his super license but was included on the 1990 entry list. However, when Senna controversially collided with Prost in 1990 at the same circuit, Balestre did not intervene or sanction the Brazilian. Years later, after leaving the presidency of FIA, Balestre admitted to having acted to benefit Prost in 1989.

Balestre was elected as president of the FIA, while remaining president of FISA, in 1986. He was replaced as president of FISA in 1991 when he lost the election to Max Mosley in October by a vote of 43 to 29. Facing certain defeat in the re-election to the FIA presidency in October 1993, Balestre elected to stand down, and proposed that FISA be abolished and Mosley replace him as president of the FIA. Balestre maintained the presidency of the FFSA until the end of 1996.

Death
Balestre died on 27 March 2008, aged 86.

References 

1921 births
2008 deaths
People from Saint-Rémy-de-Provence
Formula One people
French collaborators with Nazi Germany
Auto racing executives
French motorsport people
Fédération Internationale de l'Automobile presidents
Sportspeople from Bouches-du-Rhône